The Crush is an Irish live action short film. The film's runtime is approximately 15 minutes. It was written and directed by first-timer Michael Creagh, and produced by Damon Quinn. The film was shot during Easter 2009 in Skerries, north Dublin. Creagh cast his nine-year-old son Oran in the lead role of the story. The story sees an eight-year-old schoolboy (played by Oran Creagh) fall in love with his teacher, Miss Purdy. One day he gives her a toy ring to show his affection. But heartbreak abounds when he bumps into Miss Purdy and her boyfriend having just bought a very real engagement ring. Devastated and spurned, Ardal challenges Miss Purdy’s fiancé to a duel to the death.

Plot
Eight-year-old Ardal Travis has a crush on his second class teacher, Ms. Purdy. He demonstrates his affections by giving her a toy ring. While shopping with his mother, Ardal sees Ms. Purdy, who happily explains that she has just been proposed to by her boyfriend Pierce and is engaged to be married. Pierce appears to be a jerk: he refuses to take Ms. Purdy for lunch to celebrate the hour-old engagement, instead insisting on going home to watch football.
Ardal sees his dad put a gun carefully in the closet; he stares into the closet contemplating his options.

Ardal confronts Pierce while Pierce is impatiently waiting for Ms. Purdy outside of the school.  Ardal challenges Pierce to a duel to the death, which Pierce mockingly accepts.

The next day, Ardal meets Pierce in the school yard. Pierce forgets his gun on purpose and Ardal pulls a gun on him. Pierce at first believes it is a toy, but Ardal insists it is not. Ms. Purdy attempts to intervene but Ardal refuses to back down. Pierce, reduced to a crying mess says he never loved Ms. Purdy but only proposed to her to “shut her up.” Ardal shoots Pierce and he falls to the ground.

It is revealed that the gun was a toy, after all, one that Ardal’s father was saving in the closet until his birthday. Ms. Purdy angrily calls off the engagement and breaks up with Pierce. She walks Ardal home, agreeing to “keep this between ourselves.” Ardal then tells Ms. Purdy that he doesn't deserve to marry her as well because he is "financially unstable and can't cater to all her needs" and that a woman like his teacher should get everything she wants. They then continue to walk hand in hand.

At the beginning of the movie Ms. Purdy asked her students to look up the three words (Reveal, Pretend and Love), these three words summarize the whole film.

Accolades
The film was awarded Best Irish Short at the 23rd Foyle Film Festival.
On 25 January 2011, it was nominated for the Academy Award for Best Live Action Short Film at the 83rd Academy Awards.

References

External links
 
 The Crush at the Tribeca Film Festival

2010 films
2010 short films
English-language Irish films
Films set in Ireland
Films shot in the Republic of Ireland
2010s English-language films
Irish short films